Vittadinia cuneata, known by the common name fuzzweed, is an annual or perennial, herbaceous plant in the family Asteraceae. Stems are rigid and erect with hairs. Widespread in a variety of different habitats in many parts of Australia, particularly the south east. A small woody plant, 10 to 40 cm high. Pale blue to mauve coloured flowers form in most parts of the year. The type specimen was collected in 1817 by Allan Cunningham  on the banks of the Lachlan River.

Three varieties are recognized: var. cuneata, var. hirsuta and var. morrisii.

References

Astereae
Asterales of Australia
Flora of New South Wales
Flora of South Australia
Flora of Queensland
Flora of Victoria (Australia)
Flora of Tasmania
Flora of Western Australia
Flora of the Northern Territory
Plants described in 1836